Deconica thailandensis is a species of mushroom in the family Strophariaceae. It is found in Thailand.

References

Strophariaceae
Fungi described in 2009
Fungi of Asia
Taxa named by Gastón Guzmán